The UCLA Bruins women's soccer team is an intercollegiate varsity sports team of the University of California at Los Angeles. The team is a member of the Pac-12 Conference of the National Collegiate Athletic Association. The team won its first national championship on December 8, 2013, by defeating Florida State 1–0 in overtime. The Bruins won the program's second national title on December 5, 2022, beating North Carolina 3–2 in double overtime.

Stadium 

The Bruins played their home games on the Frank Marshall Field of Drake Stadium on campus until 2017. The stadium is named in honor of Elvin C. "Ducky" Drake, UCLA's longtime trainer and former student athlete. Film producer Marshall graduated from UCLA.

In 2018, the Bruins moved to the soccer-specific stadium, Wallis Annenberg Stadium, along with the UCLA Bruins men's soccer program.
On September 23, 2022, a capacity crowd of 2,237 saw the women's team defeating Cal 4–2 at Annenberg Stadium.

Players 

As of December 5, 2022

Seasons 
Updated through October 30, 2022

Source: UCLA Athletics

Postseason

The UCLA Bruins have an NCAA Division I Tournament record of 71–22 (including penalty kicks) through twenty-one appearances.

One of their most notable runs, the No.2-seeded Bruins trounced their first three opponents each by a 5–0 margin, before falling in the Elite Eight to the No.1-seeded UNC Tar Heels, who lead the nation with 22 NCAA Championship titles in program history.  The match was decided in penalty kicks after regular time and overtime ended in a 2–2 draw.

Notable alumni 

This list of former players includes those who received international caps, made significant contributions to the team in terms of appearances or goals, or who made significant contributions to the sport after they left. It is clearly not yet complete and all inclusive, and additions and refinements will continue to be made over time.

 Louise Lieberman (1996-2000)
 Lauren Holiday (2006–2009)
 Sydney Leroux (2008–2011)
 Chanté Sandiford (2009–2011)
 Sam Mewis (2011–2014)
 Abby Dahlkemper (2011–2014)
 Rosie White (2011-2014)
 Hailie Mace (2015-2018)
 Anika Rodríguez (2016-2019)
 Jessie Fleming(2016-2019) 
 Ashley Sanchez (2017-2019)
 Karina Rodríguez (2017-2021)
 Mia Fishel (2019-2021)
 Maricarmen Reyes (2018-2022)

Another notable Bruin is Mallory Pugh, who played just one season at UCLA before going professional.  She is a starting forward on the U.S. women's national team as well as on the Washington Spirit in the National Women's Soccer League (NWSL).

Head coaches
 1993-1997 : Joy Fawcett
 1998 : Todd Saldana
 1999–2010 : Jill Ellis
 2011-2012 : B. J. Snow
 2013–2021 : Amanda Cromwell
 2021–Present : Margueritte Aozasa

References

External links 
 

 
1937 establishments in California